The Two Sergeants (Italian:I Due sergenti) is a 1951 Italian comedy film directed by Carlo Alberto Chiesa and starring Mario Carotenuto, Antonella Lualdi and Beniamino Maggio. It is one of several film adaptations of the 1823 play The Two Sergeants. The film updated the historic story of two idlers who steal some military uniforms and become mistaken for real soldiers.

Cast
 Antonella Lualdi
 Mario Carotenuto
 Adriana Serra
 Franca Valeri
 Franco Scandurra 
 Luciano Tajoli
 Nunzio Filogamo
 Guglielmo Barnabò
 Mario Castellani
 Elena Giusti
 Beniamino Maggio
 Marisa Merlini
 Adriano Rimoldi 
 Cesare Canevari 
 Pina Renzi

External links
 

1951 films
1951 comedy films
Italian comedy films
1950s Italian-language films
Military humor in film
Italian films based on plays
Films with screenplays by Giulio Scarnicci
Italian black-and-white films
1950s Italian films